Paul Quilès (27 January 1942 – 24 September 2021) was a French Socialist politician.

Biography
Quilès was born in Sig, Algeria on 27 January 1942.

Quilès was a member of the National Assembly for Paris and later Tarn département. He close to Laurent Fabius, and served as Defense Minister from 1985 to 1986, after the Rainbow Warrior scandal. He was Interior Minister from 1992 to 1993, then chairman of the Defense commission in the French National Assembly from 1997 to 2002. 

Quilès died on 24 September 2021 at the age of 79.

References

External links 
 Official Website

1942 births
2021 deaths
Deaths from cancer in France
People from Sig
Socialist Party (France) politicians
Transport ministers of France
Pieds-Noirs
French interior ministers
French Ministers of Posts, Telegraphs, and Telephones
École Polytechnique alumni
Deputies of the 6th National Assembly of the French Fifth Republic
Deputies of the 7th National Assembly of the French Fifth Republic
Deputies of the 8th National Assembly of the French Fifth Republic
Deputies of the 9th National Assembly of the French Fifth Republic
Deputies of the 10th National Assembly of the French Fifth Republic
Deputies of the 11th National Assembly of the French Fifth Republic
Deputies of the 12th National Assembly of the French Fifth Republic
Mayors of places in Occitania (administrative region)